KINE (1330 AM, "La Tejanita Christiana") is a radio station broadcasting a Spanish religious format. Licensed to Kingsville, Texas, United States, the station serves the Kingsville-Alice-Falfurrias area. The station is currently owned by Cotton Broadcasting.

References

External links
 

INE
Kingsville, Texas